San Marcello may refer to:

San Marcello Pistoiese, a frazione of the comune of San Marcello Piteglio in the Italian province of Pistoia
San Marcello (Ancona), a comune in the Italian province of Ancona
Poggio San Marcello, a comune, also in the province of Ancona
San Marcello al Corso, a church in Rome
7481 San Marcello, an asteroid

See also
Pope Marcellus I, also known as Saint Marcellus I or San Marcello